A gyani or giani (Punjabi: ਗਿਆਨੀ ) is an honorific Sikh title used by someone learned in Sikhism and who often leads the congregation in prayers, such as Ardas, or in singing (kirtan). The word  means "knowledge" in Punjabi, being a derivative of the Sanskrit word . So a "gyani" is one who has spiritual and religious knowledge and can help the congregation—the —in understanding the Sacred Texts and the history of the religion.

Characteristics
A gyani can be a male or a female, as the Sikh religion gives equal rights to both sexes. He or she will have undergone an intensive course of study and evaluation at an academic or religious institute, will have a thorough knowledge of the Guru Granth Sahib, the Sikh Holy Scripture, and will have the ability to translate the words of sacred text into simple everyday language. Gyanis can also communicate in English (not always the case), a major bonus to western children who are not fluent in Punjabi or Gurmukhi, the language of the holy scriptures. In religious contexts, a gyani may also be called a brahm gyani.

Gyani or Giani is also an academic degree conferred in Punjabi literature.

Notable people known as 'gyani' 
Sant Giani Jarnail Singh Ji Bhindranwale, Political leader, 14th Jathedar of Damdami Taksal
Giani Sant Singh Maskeen, Sikh Ratan
Giani Balwant Singh Nandgarh, kh politician and Jathedar of Takht Sri Damdama Sahib, one of five seats of temporal authority of Sikhism
Giani Dhanwant Singh Sital (1912-1980), Punjabi writer 
Giani Ditt Singh (ca. 1850–1901), historian, scholar, poet, editor and an eminent Singh Sabha reformer
Giani Gian Singh Nihang,  Sikh scholar and martial artist, belong to Nihang order
Giani Gurbachan Singh (born 1948), the 30th Jathedar of Akal Takht
Giani Gurdit Singh (1923-2007), one of the greatest contemporary writers in Punjabi 
Giani Gurmukh Singh Musafir, first Chief Minister of Punjab
Giani Pritam Singh Dhillon, freedom fighter and prominent member of the Ghadar Party
Giani Zail Singh (1916-1994), the seventh President of India, serving from 1982 to 1987
Pratap Singh Giani (also Partap Singh Gyani, 1855–1920), Sikh academician, scholar and calligraphist

See also
 Sikh titles

References 

Sikh terminology
Honorifics
Honorary titles